The Bucket List is a 2007 American buddy adventure comedy-drama film directed and produced by Rob Reiner, written by Justin Zackham, and starring Jack Nicholson and Morgan Freeman. The main plot follows two terminally ill men on their road trip with a wish list of things to do before they "kick the bucket".

The film premiered on December 15, 2007 in Hollywood and opened in limited release in the United States on December 25, 2007, by Warner Bros. The film then had a wide release on January 11, 2008. Despite receiving mixed reviews from critics, the film was chosen by National Board of Review as one of the top ten films of 2007 and was a box office success, opening at #1 in the United States, and grossing $175.4 million worldwide.

Plot
Two elderly men, blue-collar automotive mechanic Carter Chambers and billionaire Edward Cole meet for the first time in a hospital owned by Edward after both men are diagnosed with terminal lung cancer. 

Carter, a gifted amateur historian and family man, wanted to become a history professor in his youth but chose to start a family instead. Edward, a four-time divorced healthcare tycoon and cultured loner, enjoys drinking kopi luwak, one of the most expensive coffees in the world and mocking his personal valet Matthew, whom he wrongly but intentionally calls Thomas.

While in the hospital, Carter and Edward manage to find common ground. For fun, Carter started writing a list of activities to do before he "kicks the bucket." After hearing he has less than a year to live, he dejectedly discards his list. 

Edward finds the list the next morning and urges him to do everything on it, adds his own items and offers to finance all expenses. Carter agrees and though his wife Virginia objects, the two patients begin their globetrotting last vacation along with Matthew. They go skydiving, drive a vintage Shelby Mustang and Dodge Challenger around California Speedway, fly over the North Pole, eat dinner at Chèvre d'or, visit the Taj Mahal, ride motorcycles on the Great Wall of China, attend a lion safari in Tanzania and visit Mount Everest.

Atop the Great Pyramid of Giza, they confide mutually about faith and family. Carter reveals that he has long been feeling less in love with his wife and feels some regret for his chosen path. Edward discloses that he is deeply hurt by his estrangement from his only daughter, who disowned him after he drove away her abusive husband. Later, while in Hong Kong, Edward hires a prostitute to approach Carter, who has never been with any woman but his wife. Carter declines and insists they stop the bucket list and go home.

During the return journey, Carter tries to reunite Edward with his estranged daughter. Considering this a breach of trust, Edward scolds Carter and then angrily storms off. Carter returns home to his family while Edward, feeling alone though breaks down weeping in his luxury home. Carter’s family reunion turns out to be short-lived as while readying for marital romance, he collapses and is rushed to the hospital, where it is discovered that the cancer has spread to his brain. Edward, now in a remarkable remission, visits him to reconcile. 

Carter, always a Jeopardy! fan knowledgeable about trivia, reveals how Edward's kopi luwak coffee is fed to and defecated by a jungle cat before being harvested. As the two laugh hysterically over the obscure fact, Carter implores Edward to finish the list for him.

After Carter dies during surgery, Edward manages to reconcile with his own daughter and she introduces him to the granddaughter he never knew he had. After greeting the little girl by kissing her cheek, Edward thoughtfully crosses "kiss the most beautiful girl in the world" off the bucket list. Soon after, Edward delivers a eulogy at Carter’s funeral, during which he explains that the last three months of Carter's life were, thanks to Carter, the best three months of his own.

An epilogue reveals that Edward lived to age 81 and Matthew then took his ashes to a peak in the Himalayas. As Matthew places a Chock full o'Nuts coffee can of Edward's ashes alongside another can of Carter's ashes, he crosses off the last item on the bucket list, "witness something truly majestic" and tucks the completed list between the cans.

Cast
 Jack Nicholson as Edward Perriman Cole
 Morgan Freeman as Carter Chambers
 Sean Hayes as Matthew / Thomas
 Beverly Todd as Virginia Chambers
 Rob Morrow as Dr Hollins
 Alfonso Freeman as Roger Chambers
 Rowena King as Angelica
 Jennifer DeFrancisco as Emily Cole
 Serena Reeder as Rachel
 Annton Berry Jr as Kai
 Verda Bridges as Chandra
 Destiny Brownridge as Maya
 Brian Copeland as Lee
 Ian Anthony Dale as Instructor
 Noel Guglielmi as Mechanic
 Jonathan Hernandez as Manny
 Andrea J. Johnson as Elizabeth
 Jordan Lund as Tattoo Artist
 Jonathan Mangum as Richard
 Christopher Stapleton as Kyle
 Alex Trebek as Himself
 Taylor Ann Thompson as Edward's Granddaughter
 Karen Maruyama as Nurse Shing

Release
The film opened in wide release in the United States and Canada on January 11, 2008 and grossed $19,392,416 from around 3,200 screens across 2,911 theaters, averaging $6,662 per theater ($6,060 per screen) and ranking #1 at the box office. The film closed on June 5, 2008, never having a weekend-to-weekend decline of more than 40%, and ended up with a final gross of $93,466,502 in the United States and Canada and another $81,906,000 overseas, for a total gross of $175,372,502 worldwide, easily recouping the film's considerable $45 million budget and turning a sizable profit for Warner Bros.

Reception
The Bucket List received mixed reviews from critics. On Rotten Tomatoes, the film has a rating of 41% based on 178 reviews, with an average rating of 5.20/10. The site's critical consensus reads, "Not even the earnest performances of the two leads can rescue The Bucket List from its schmaltzy script". Metacritic gave the film a score of 42 out of 100, based on 34 critics, indicating "mixed or average reviews". Audiences polled by CinemaScore gave the film an average grade of "A-" on an A+ to F scale.

Chicago Sun-Times film critic Roger Ebert, who was diagnosed with thyroid cancer in 2002 and whose lower jaw was removed in 2006, criticized the film's portrayal of cancer sufferers, writing in his one-star review that The Bucket List "...thinks dying of cancer is a laff riot followed by a dime-store epiphany."

Accolades
Named one of the Top Ten Films of the Year by the National Board of Review.

Soundtrack
A score album from Varèse Sarabande was released on January 15, 2008, featuring composer Marc Shaiman's original score for the film as well as a selection of newly recorded themes from Shaiman's previous scoring projects, including City Slickers, Simon Birch, The Addams Family, Mother, North, Sleepless in Seattle, South Park: Bigger Longer & Uncut, Mr. Saturday Night, and Stuart Saves His Family. 

It also features a rearranged version of the James Bond theme "Goldfinger" (titled "Printmaster"), with Shaiman's own voice and lyrics in which he spoofs the industry's habit of tracking music in scenes where they don't belong.

The full list of 23 tracks is as follows:
 Hospital Hallway (from the movie)
 Like Smoke through a Keyhole (from the movie)
 Best in L.A. (from the movie)
 Really Bad News (from the movie)
 Milord – Édith Piaf (from the movie)
 Hotel Source (from the movie)
 Did You Hear It? (from the movie)
 Flying Home (from the movie)
 Homecomings (from the movie)
 Life and Death (from the movie)
 The Mountain (from the movie)
 End Credits (from the movie)
 Theme from The American President ("A Seed of Grain")
 Theme from City Slickers
 Theme from Simon Birch
 Theme from The Addams Family
 Theme from Mother
 Theme from North
 Sleepless in Seattle / A Wink and a Smile"
 South Park: Bigger Longer & Uncut/"Blame Canada"
 Theme from Mr. Saturday Night
 "Printmaster" (After John Barry's "Goldfinger")
 Theme from Stuart Saves His Family ("What Makes a Family")

The theme song, John Mayer's "Say," is not included on the Bucket List soundtrack, but included on the re-release of Mayer's third album Continuum.

Home media
The film was released on DVD and Blu-ray June 10, 2008.

See also

 Hawks, a 1988 film with a similar plot
 Knockin' on Heaven's Door, a 1997 film with a similar plot
 Bucket List (2018 film), Indian Marathi language comedy-drama

Footnotes

  The screenplay, written by Justin Zackham, coined the expression “Bucket List,” after Zackham wrote his own “List of Things to do Before I Kick the Bucket”, and shortened it to “Justin’s Bucket List.” The first item on his list was to “get a film made at a major studio.” This list gave him the idea for the screenplay, and “The Bucket List” became his first studio film.
  The "Castle Rock Entertainment" logo does not appear in this film's opening.

References

External links

 
 
 

2007 films
2000s adventure comedy-drama films
2000s buddy comedy-drama films
2000s road comedy-drama films
American buddy comedy-drama films
American adventure comedy-drama films
American road comedy-drama films
2000s English-language films
Films about cancer
Films about death
Films about old age
Films directed by Rob Reiner
Films set in California
Films set in China
Films set in Egypt
Films set in France
Films set in Hong Kong
Films set in India
Films set in Los Angeles
Films set in Tanzania
Films shot in California
Films shot in France
Films shot in Los Angeles
Warner Bros. films
Castle Rock Entertainment films
Films scored by Marc Shaiman
Films set in Nepal
2007 comedy films
2007 drama films
2000s American films